Diaphorocellus is a genus of African palp-footed spiders that was first described by Eugène Louis Simon in 1893.

Species
, the genus contains six species, found in Botswana, Madagascar, Tanzania, South Africa, and Namibia:
Diaphorocellus albooculatus Lawrence, 1927 – Namibia
Diaphorocellus biplagiatus Simon, 1893 (type) – South Africa
Diaphorocellus helveolus (Simon, 1910) – Botswana
Diaphorocellus isalo Zonstein & Marusik, 2020 – Madagascar
Diaphorocellus jocquei Zonstein & Marusik, 2020 – Madagascar
Diaphorocellus rufus (Tullgren, 1910) – Tanzania

See also
 List of Palpimanidae species

References

Araneomorphae genera
Palpimanidae
Spiders of Africa